This is a comprehensive list of awards won by Helena Paparizou, a Swedish-Greek singer-songwriter.

Arion Music Awards
The Arion Music Awards were the official Greek music awards organized by Greece's charting authority, IFPI Greece. Debuting in 2002, they were the successor of the Hellenic Music Pop Corn Awards which were organized by the magazine Pop Star since the early 1990s until 2001. The Arions were held for the first five years by the Mega Channel and later by ANT1 until their demise in 2007 due to low interest and ratings. The awards were usually held in April but in 2007 were held in October due to the network change. Paparizou has won three awards from thirteen nominations.

Balkan Music Awards

The Balkan Music Award is an annual Balkan music award show held every year in different cities of the Balkans. The first edition of the show was held on May 16, 2010 in Sofia, Bulgaria, where many famous and young Balkan artists were awarded. The show is organised and hosted by Balkanika Music Television.

Cyprus Music Awards
The Cyprus Music Awards are held annually by Cyprus College in Cyprus since 2007.

European Border Breakers Awards

The European Border Breakers Awards are held annually by the European Union. They were created by the European Union in 2004 and are given to ten artists who manage to have success with their debut album abroad.

Eurovision Song Contest

The Eurovision Song Contest is an annual competition held among active member countries of the EBU. The contest, which has been broadcast every year since its debut in 1956, is one of the longest-running television programs and most watched in the world. In 2001, she participated as a member of Antique. In 2005, she won Eurovision alone.

Congratulations (Eurovision)
Congratulations: 50 Years of the Eurovision Song Contest was a television program organized by the EBU to commemorate the Eurovision Song Contest's fiftieth anniversary and to determine the Contest's most popular entrant of its fifty years. It took place at Forum Copenhagen on 22 October 2005. The year later in a similar ceremony at the Feel The Legend show held in Athens in May 2006 before the Eurovision, the song fell to the number 5 spot of all-time favorites.

MAD Video Music Awards
The MAD Video Music Awards are held annually by the MAD TV and are currently the only mainstream music award in Greece. They are considered the main music awards for Greece, although not affiliated officially with the music industry. Paparizou has won 29 awards from 69 nominations, becoming the most awarded artist of the VMA's.

MAD Music Awards Cyprus by Cyta/Vodafone
For the first in Cyprus. The show will be held at the end of October

Melodifestivalen
Helena appeared as a guest star in the Melodifestivalen in 2006, 2012. Two years after her last appearance in the show, Helena came back as a contestant for the first time in the contest with her "Survivor". In the grand final she took the 4th place.

MTV Europe Music Awards

OGAE Song Contest
OGAE, is the international fan club of the Eurovision Song Contest. It has branches in 37 European countries. Every year, the organisation puts together four non-profit competitions (Song Contest, Second Chance Contest, Video Contest and Homecomposed Song Contest). The OGAE Song Contest is an audio event in which all OGAE national clubs can enter with an original song released in the previous 12 months in their countries and sang in one of the country's official language. Paparizou was the winner of the 21st OGAE in 2006. After Paparizou's performance on Eurovision 2006 with the song Mambo!, Terry Wogan quoted: "She is just showing she could win it again this year if she’d wanted to"

OGAE Second Chance Contest
OGAE Second Chance Contest organised between members of the international Eurovision Song Contest fan club OGAE to select the best song not to make it to the Eurovision Song Contest through their national finals. In 2005, Helena win in the Greek national final with her song "My Number One", but her songs "OK" and "Let's Get Wild" took the 2nd and 3rd place, respectively. The OGAE of Greece decided the song "Let's Get Wild" to take part in "OGAE Second Chance Contest" and that song took the 4th place. Also, 9 years after her appearance in the contest, Helena was contestant in the Swedish national final with the song "Survivor" and she took the 4th place. The OGAE of Sweden decided that song to take part in the "OGAE Second Chance Contest". Finally, she won in the "OGAE Second Chance Contest" with 259 points.

OGAE Video Contest
OGAE Video Contest organised between members of the international Eurovision Song Contest fan club OGAE to select the best video from artists who competed in the Eurovision Song Contest. In 2015, Helena was nominated with her latest music video and single in Greece Otan Aggeli Klene. Finally, in January 2016 results were announced and she reached 5th place in the "OGAE Video Contest" with 73 points.

Women of the Year Awards
The Women of the Year Awards are held annually from 2003 by the Greek Life & Style Magazine. Paparizou has nominated for two awards.

References

Paparizou, Elena
Paparizou, Elena
Awards and nominations